Khorramdarreh County is in Zanjan province, Iran. The capital of the county is the city of Khorramdarreh. At the 2006 census, the county's population was 60,027 in 15,317 households. The following census in 2011 counted 65,166 people in 18,888 households. At the 2016 census, the county's population was 67,951 in 21,215 households.

Administrative divisions

The population history of Khorramdarreh County's administrative divisions over three consecutive censuses is shown in the following table. The latest census shows one district, two rural districts, and one city.

References

 

Counties of Zanjan Province